Avto Plus (Macedonian Cyrillic: Авто Плус) is a monthly magazine for automotive industry, motorcycling and motorsport published in North Macedonia. It is the first privately published magazine after Macedonia's independence from Yugoslavia in 1991. Avto Plus is cooperating with Italian magazine Quattroruote.

References

1993 establishments in the Republic of Macedonia
Magazines established in 1993
Magazines published in North Macedonia
Mass media in Skopje
Monthly magazines
Sports magazines